Azorei Hen is a residential neighborhood of Tel Aviv, Israel. It is located in the northwestern part of the city, and houses about 2,000 residents. It is named after Hannah Ne'eman (initials "hen").

History
Azorei Hen was founded in the 1980s on an empty and isolated area, as a closed neighborhood, by the Azorim development company. The main part of the neighborhood was built in the 1990s and 2000s.

References

Neighborhoods of Tel Aviv